Forge Valley railway station was situated on the North Eastern Railway's Pickering to Seamer branch line.  It served the twin villages of East and West Ayton, and the local beauty spot Forge Valley. The station opened to passenger traffic on 1 May 1882.

The station was host to a LNER camping coach from 1935 to 1939. 
The station closed on 3 June 1950 when the line closed to passenger traffic.

The station was named Forge Valley after a local beauty spot to avoid naming it after either of the Ayton villages that it was located near. This was normal practice when another station existed on the network that could be confusing to passengers, in this case Great Ayton, which is on the Middlesbrough to Whitby Line.

The station is currently in more workaday use as a road and council highways depot for North Yorkshire County Council.

References

External links

 Forge Valley station on navigable 1947 O. S. map

Disused railway stations in the Borough of Scarborough
Former North Eastern Railway (UK) stations
Railway stations in Great Britain opened in 1882
Railway stations in Great Britain closed in 1950